The Keio Hai Nisai Stakes (Japanese 京王杯2歳ステークス) is a Japanese Grade 2 flat horse race in Japan for two-year-old Thoroughbreds. It is run over a distance of 1400 metres at Tokyo Racecourse in November.

The Keio Hai Nisai Stakes was first run in 1965 and was elevated to Grade 2 status in 1984. It was usually run at Nakayama Racecourse until 1979 and made a one-off return to that venue in 2002. It serves as a trial race for the Asahi Hai Futurity Stakes.

Winners since 2000 

 The 2002 race took place at Nakayama Racecourse over a distance of 1,200 metres.

Earlier winners

 1984 - Dyna Shoot
 1985 - Daishin Fubuki
 1986 - Hokuto Helios
 1987 - Shino Cross
 1988 - Doctor Spurt
 1989 - Sakura Saezuri
 1990 - Big Fight
 1991 - Yamanin Miracle
 1992 - Meiner Castle
 1993 - Yamanin Ability
 1994 - Go Go Nakayama
 1995 - Adjudicator
 1996 - Meiner Max
 1997 - Grass Wonder
 1998 - Umeno Fiber
 1999 - Daiwa Carson

See also
 Horse racing in Japan
 List of Japanese flat horse races

References

Turf races in Japan